φ Eridani (Latinised as Phi Eridani) is a star in the constellation Eridanus. It is visible to the naked eye with an apparent visual magnitude of 3.55. The distance to this star, as determined using the parallax method, is around 154 light-years.

This is a B-type star with a stellar classification of B8IV-V, suggesting it shows traits of a main-sequence star and a subgiant. It is spinning rapidly with a projected rotational velocity of 250 km/s. This rotation is giving the star an oblate shape with an equator that is 17% larger than the polar radius. The estimated angular size is 0.68 milliarcseconds. Since the distance is known, this yields a physical size of around 3.4 times the radius of the Sun. It has 3.55 times the mass of the Sun and radiates 255 times the solar luminosity from its outer atmosphere at an effective temperature of about 13,716 K.

Phi Eridani may form a wide binary star system with a 9th-magnitude star at lies an angular separation of 86″. This companion is a G-type main-sequence star with a stellar classification of G2V. It may also have a physical association with the naked-eye star Eta Horologii. It is a member of the Tucana-Horologium association, a -old group of stars that share a common motion through space.

References

B-type subgiants
Eridanus (constellation)
Eridani, Phi
014228
010602
0674
Durchmusterung objects